"Impulsive" is a song by American pop group Wilson Phillips, released as the third single from their debut album, Wilson Phillips (1990). Written by Clif Magness and Steve Kipner, it was released in 1990 on SBK Records. The song reached number four on the US Billboard Hot 100 and number one on the Canadian RPM Top Singles chart. It was the first single to feature Wendy Wilson as the lead vocalist and includes a slide guitar solo from Joe Walsh. Billboard ranked the song number 99 on their list of the "100 Greatest Girl Group Songs of All Time".

Track listings

US cassette single
 "Impulsive" (AOR mix) – 4:33
 "Impulsive" (album version) – 4:34

UK 7-inch single
A. "Impulsive"
B. "Impulsive" (album mix)

UK CD single
 "Impulsive"
 "Impulsive" (album mix)
 "Release Me"

European 12-inch single
A1. "Impulsive" (remix) – 4:38
B1. "Next to You (Someday I'll Be)" – 4:57
B2. "Hold On" – 4:23

Japanese mini-CD single
 "Impulsive (インパルシヴ)"
 "A Reason to Believe (ア・リーズン・トゥ・ビリーヴ)"

Charts

Weekly charts

Year-end charts

Release history

References

1990 singles
1990 songs
RPM Top Singles number-one singles
SBK Records singles
Songs written by Clif Magness
Songs written by Steve Kipner
Wilson Phillips songs